This is a list of people from the Saguenay-Lac-Saint-Jean region of Quebec.

Samuel Archibald - writer
Michel Barrette - comedian
Jean-Pierre Blackburn - Conservative Party MP
Gérard Bouchard - historian
Lucien Bouchard - Premier of Quebec
Joanne Corneau aka Corno - painter
Guillaume Côté - ballet dancer
Michel Côté - actor
Jeff Fillion - radio host
Gilbert Fillion - Bloc Québécois Member of Parliament
Dédé Fortin -  singer-songwriter
Jeanick Fournier - singer and Canada's Got Talent season 2 winner
Christiane Gagnon - politician
Francesca Gagnon - singer-songwriter and actress
Marc Gagnon - short track speed skater
Rémy Girard - actor
Michel Goulet - former NHL hockey player
Charles Hudon - NHL hockey player
Régis Labeaume - Mayor of Ville de Québec
Pauline Lapointe - actress
Pierre Lapointe - singer
Plume Latraverse - singer
Pauline Martin - actress
Guillaume Morissette - writer
Louise Portal - actress
Marie Tifo - actress
Jean Tremblay - Mayor of Ville de Saguenay; TV personality
Mario Tremblay - former NHL player and head coach
Roland Michel Tremblay - author, poet, scriptwriter
Stéphan Tremblay - Bloc Québécois MP and Parti Québécois MNA
Georges Vézina - hockey player
Annie Villeneuve - singer
Élisabeth Vonarburg - sci-fi writer

See also
Lists of people from Quebec by region
List of Quebecers
List of Quebec regions

 
Saguenay-Lac-Saint-Jean, List of